Yaw Antwi (born 15 June 1985) is a Ghanaian professional footballer who plays as a striker. He represented Ghana at international level.

Club career
Born in Sunyani, Antwi played with Bofoakwa Tano and Liberty Professionals in the Ghana Premier League, becoming one of the most prolific strikers in the country.

In the summer of 2009, Antwi moved to Serbia and signed with SuperLiga side Napredak Kruševac. He was the club's top scorer during the 2009–10 season with nine goals in 26 appearances, but failed to save the club from relegation. In July 2010, Antwi was transferred to Vojvodina, signing a three-year deal. He was also sent on loan to Metalac Gornji Milanovac and Bežanija during his contract with Vojvodina.

After six months without a club, Antwi signed with First League side Timok in the winter of 2014. He scored five goals in 14 appearances until the end of the 2013–14 season.

International career
Antwi scored on his official international debut for Ghana in a friendly match against South Africa on 15 October 2008. He made two more appearances for the Black Stars in 2010.

Antwi also represented his country at the 2009 African Nations Championship, scoring two goals, as the team finished runners-up of the competition.

References

External links
 Srbijafudbal profile
 
 

1985 births
Living people
Association football forwards
Bofoakwa Tano F.C. players
Expatriate footballers in Serbia
FK Bežanija players
FK Inđija players
FK Metalac Gornji Milanovac players
FK Napredak Kruševac players
FK Timok players
FK Vojvodina players
Ghana international footballers
Ghana Premier League players
Ghanaian expatriate footballers
Ghanaian expatriate sportspeople in Serbia
Ghanaian footballers
Liberty Professionals F.C. players
People from Sunyani District
Serbian SuperLiga players
Serbian First League players
Ghana A' international footballers
2009 African Nations Championship players